Eslamabad-e Olya may refer to:

 Eslamabad Gamasyab Olya, a village in Delfan County, Lorestan Province, Iran
 Eslamabad-e Olya, Golestan
 Eslamabad-e Olya, Ilam
 Eslamabad-e Olya, Kermanshah
 Eslamabad-e Olya, Khuzestan
 Eslamabad-e Olya, Khorramabad, a village in Khorramabad County, Lorestan Province, Iran
 Eslamabad-e Olya, Pol-e Dokhtar, a village in Pol-e Dokhtar County, Lorestan Province, Iran